Tallington is a village and civil parish in the South Kesteven district of Lincolnshire, England. The population of the civil parish at the 2011 census was 497. The village has around 200 houses.

Geography

Tallington is on the main A1175 road (formerly the A16) (for Market Deeping) which runs between Stamford and Spalding. To the west is Uffington. Tallington has a busy level crossing over the East Coast Main Line. There was once a Tallington railway station, but it is now closed. Since the 1930s there has been a plan for a Tallington bypass and bridge over the railway ; even though the village ended up making concrete bridges for many UK motorways (including much of the Yorkshire section of the M62), there has never been a bridge made for the village. Dow Mac even offered to donate a bridge to the village.

From the East Coast Main Line south-east of the village, the parish boundary follows the River Welland to the west, it meets Uffington and crosses the A16 a half-mile west of the village at the point where the pylons cross the road, then skirts the edge of Casewick Park. It crosses the ECML a half-mile north of the village, and meets Barholm and Stowe. It skirts the northern edge of Barholm Lodge, across the north section of Tallington Lakes and meets West Deeping at King Street. It follows King Street southwards to the A16, which it follows to the west, around the western edge of West Deeping, to the River Welland, north of Lolham Mill, where it meets the City of Peterborough and the parish of Bainton.

Local Government
Tallington is served by a Parish Council, two District Councillors who represent Casewick Ward on South Kesteven District Council and a County Councillor representing Deepings West & Rural Division on Lincolnshire County Council. The current District Councillors elected in May 2011 and re-elected in 2015 are Kelham Cooke (Con) and Rosemary Trollope-Bellew (Con). The Lincolnshire County Councillor elected in 2017 is Rosemary Trollope-Bellew (Con).

Community
At the Tallington Lakes Leisure Park, made from gravel pits, is a dry ski slope and water activities with a campsite. The parish church is dedicated to St Lawrence and is in the Uffington Group of churches. The village public house is the Whistle Stop next to the railway, formerly the Kesteven Arms. The village station closed in 1959. The River Welland passes across the south of the village.

Dow-Mac

Tallington Lakes are situated directly east of the former Dow-Mac concrete works, and are formed from its gravel pits. Dow-Mac, on Barholm Road, was formed by Harry Dowsett, who lived in Greatford Hall, in 1943 as Dowsett Engineering Construction, later working with Mackay. It made concrete railway sleepers during the war, and later motorway concrete pillars and beams. Prestressed concrete was first made by Dow Mac (Products) Ltd in Tallington.

The site is now known as Tarmac Precast Concrete.

References

External links
 
 Tallington Lakes
 Information about the village
 Uffington Group
 Parish council
 Tarmac Building Products

Villages in Lincolnshire
Civil parishes in Lincolnshire
South Kesteven District
Concrete pioneers